"Impossible" is a song by American hip-hop recording artist Kanye West, featuring Twista, Keyshia Cole and BJ. The song was not featured on West's albums Late Registration (2005) and Graduation (2007) that were released around the same time as it, but was featured on the Mission: Impossible III soundtrack. The track was actually used as the official theme song for this film. It charted on the US Billboard Hot R&B/Hip-Hop Songs chart and Bubbling Under Hot 100 in 2006.

Background
Along with the rest of the soundtrack for the film Mission: Impossible III, "Impossible" was recorded over the course of eight days at the Sony Scoring Stage in Culver City, California. Franchise star Tom Cruise was delighted at West contributing to the soundtrack, describing himself as being "a fan of Kanye's work".

Composition
Vocals from "It's Impossible" by New Birth are sampled throughout the track. West didn't contribute to the production whatsoever, since the song was solely produced by Michael Giacchino, who composed all of the soundtrack for the film.

Critical reception
"Impossible" was placed on a list of '20 Horrible Songs Made By Great Rappers' that Al Shipley of Complex published in 2013. Jonathan Ringen of Rolling Stone rated the song two out of five stars and elaborated by writing: "It doesn't quite work: The skittering beat never settles into a groove, and the rhymes never explain what, exactly, is supposed to be so impossible."

Track listing
CD single
 "Impossible" (Radio) – 3:23
 "Impossible" (Extended Radio) – 5:12
 "Impossible" (Instrumental) – 5:09

12" single
A-side
"Impossible" (Radio) - 3:25
"Impossible" (Extended Version) - 3:25
B-side
"Impossible" (Instrumental) - 5:09
"Drive Slow" (feat. Paul Wall and GLC) (Strings Mix) - 5:41

Digital download
"Impossible" (Radio Edit) - 3:22

Commercial performance
The track spent a total of 16 weeks on the US Billboard Hot R&B/Hip-Hop Songs chart and managed to reach its peak position of 54 on June 24, 2006, over a month after being released as a single. It reached number 27 on the US Bubbling Under Hot 100 Singles chart on May 27, 2006.

Charts

References

2006 singles
Kanye West songs
Twista songs
Keyshia Cole songs
Songs written by Kanye West
Songs written by Twista
Roc-A-Fella Records singles
Mission: Impossible music